Kypseli may refer to the following places in Greece:

Kypseli, Athens, a neighbourhood in Athens
Kypseli, Kastoria, a village in the municipal unit Nestorio, Kastoria regional unit
Kypseli, Methana, a village in the Methana peninsula
Kypseli, Patras, a neighbourhood in Patras
Kypseli, Xanthi, a village in the Xanthi regional unit

el:Κυψέλη (αποσαφήνιση)